The 2015 Zabul massacre refers to the killing of seven Afghan Shia Hazaras on 9 November 2015 in the southern Afghan province of Zabul.

Hostage-taking and executions
Fighters claiming allegiance to the Islamic State took seven members of the Hazara ethnic group hostage in October 2015 in Ghazni and held them in Arghandab District, Zabul Province. The hostages included four men, two women, and a nine-year-old girl, Shukria Tabassum. The hostages were moved 56 times to avoid their rescue by Afghan military forces. Two hundred Taliban fighters were involved in battles with the Islamic State group and another insurgent group.

The hostages were executed on 9 November 2015 by the Islamic State group Several Western media sources described the execution as a beheading. Martine van Bijlert stated that this was most likely a mistranslation, and that the victims' throats had been slit, most likely with kite wire sharpened with glass for kite fighting.

The victims were later found by the Taliban. Local elders helped arrange for the bodies to be transferred to a hospital in territory controlled by the Afghan government.

Legal status
Nicholas Haysom, head of the United Nations Assistance Mission in Afghanistan, stated that the killings could constitute war crimes. UNAMA commented that the hostage-taking and murder of civilians are serious violations of humanitarian law.

Aftermath
The grassroots Tabassum movement started on 11 November 2015, when about two to twenty thousand mourners carried the coffins containing the seven bodies to the presidential palace in Kabul, protesting against the lack of security provided by government forces.

See also
List of kidnappings

References

2010s missing person cases
Zabul massacre
Hazarajat
History of Zabul Province
Kidnappings in Afghanistan
Kidnapping in the 2010s
Killing of captives by the Islamic State of Iraq and the Levant
Massacres in 2015
Massacres in Afghanistan
Massacres of Hazara people
Massacres perpetrated by ISIL
Missing person cases in Afghanistan
Zabul massacre
Zabul massacre